Heresy in the Catholic Church means "the obstinate denial or obstinate doubt after the reception of baptism of some truth which is to be believed by divine and Catholic faith..." The term "heresy" connotes both a choice and the thing chosen.

Definition and characteristics

Definition 
Heresy has a specific meaning in the Catholic Church when it applies to someone's belief. There are four elements which constitute a person's formal heresy:

 the person in question must have had a valid Christian baptism
 the person claims to still be a Christian
 the person publicly and obstinately denies or positively doubts a truth that the Catholic Church regards as revealed by God (through the Scriptures or Sacred tradition)
 the disbelief must be morally culpable, that is, there must be a refusal to accept what is known to be a doctrinal imperative.

Therefore, to become a heretic and thus lose communion with the Catholic Church and hence no longer be Catholic, one must deny or question a truth that is taught by the Catholic Church as revealed by God, and at the same time know that the Catholic Church teaches it. However, if the person denied or questioned such a doctrine, but in good faith, that person is not considered a formal heretic by the Catholic Church, though it is an expression of material heresy.

Canon 751 of the Latin Church's 1983 Code of Canon Law, promulgated by Pope John Paul II in 1983, defines heresy as the following: "Heresy is the obstinate denial or doubt after the reception of baptism of some truth which is to be believed by divine and Catholic faith". Heresy is contrasted with apostasy – "the total repudiation of the Christian faith" –, and with schism – " the refusal of submission to the Supreme Pontiff or of communion with the members of the Church subject to him". This definition and contrast are reused in the Catechism of the Catholic Church. The Catechism also contrasts heresy with incredulity, which is "the neglect of revealed truth or the willful refusal to assent to it".

Formal and material heresy 

The Catholic Church distinguishes between formal and material heresy.  In the case of “formal” heresy, the person must know and properly understand what the Church actually teaches and then freely reject it. This sort of heresy is sinful because in this case the heretic freely and knowingly holds an opinion that "is destructive of the virtue of Christian faith [...] disturbs the unity, and challenges the Divine authority, of the Church" and "strikes at the very source of faith".

As to “material” heresy, a person misunderstands or misstates a key Catholic teaching, and thereby unknowingly advances a serious theological error. This happens when the person has a mistaken, partial, or distorted understanding of the faith.

A person who holds a material heresy may therefore not be a heretic in the strict sense.
Material heresy is an opinion that is such that by holding it someone "denies a truth that must be held by divine and Catholic faith, but he is such because of invincible ignorance or because of an error held in good faith. The opinion of a material heretic may produce the same objective results as formal heresy, but the heretic commits no sin by holding it.

Manifest, occult, public, and private heresy 
The Catholic Church distinguishes between manifest, occult, public, and private heretics:

Church membership 

Robert Bellarmine and most modern Catholic theologians (such as Palmieri, Billot, and ) consider that occult heretics "remain members of the Church, because the loss of membership of the Church, just as much as its acquisition, on account of the visibility of the Church, can only result from external legally ascertainable facts"; Ludwig Ott deems this opinion as "more probable".

According to Ott, manifest heretics, even when they are only heretic materially, are not part of the Catholic Church. He adds that manifest material heretics "do not belong to the body of the Church, that is to the legal commonwealth of the Church. However, this does not prevent them from belonging spiritually to the Church by their desire to belong to the Church (votum Ecclesiae) and through this, achieving justification and salvation".

Salaverri and Nicolau give the following summary of theological opinions:

Salaverri and Nicolau, for their part, consider that material (even if manifest) heretics along with occult heretics are part of the Catholic Church.

Degrees 

There are four degrees of heresy in the Catholic Church according to the Catholic Encyclopedia:

 Pertinacious adhesion to a doctrine contradictory to a point of faith clearly defined by the Catholic Church is heresy pure and simple, heresy in the first degree
 If the doctrine in question has not been expressly defined or is not clearly proposed as an article of faith in the ordinary, authorized teaching of the Catholic Church, an opinion opposed to it is styled sententia haeresi proxima, that is, an opinion approaching heresy
 Next, a doctrinal proposition, without directly contradicting a received dogma, may yet involve logical consequences at variance with revealed truth. Such a proposition is not heretical, it is a propositio theologice erronea, that is, erroneous in theology
 Lastly, the opposition to an article of faith may not be strictly demonstrable, but only reach a certain degree of probability. In that case the doctrine is termed sententia de haeresi suspecta, haeresim sapiens (scholarly heretic); that is, an opinion suspected, or savouring, of heresy
Other classifications of theological censures exist.

History

In the thirteenth century heresy was defined by Thomas Aquinas as "a species of infidelity in men who, having professed the faith of Christ, corrupt its dogmas". Aquinas continues:

Then-Catholic priest Martin Luther made comments that were later summarized in the 1520 bull Exsurge Domine as: "Haereticos comburi est contra voluntatem Spiritus" ("It is contrary to the Spirit to burn heretics"). This summary was one of the statements specifically censured in this papal bull. When Luther did not accept the bull nor to give a broad recantation of his writings, he was excommunicated in the subsequent 1521 papal bull Decet Romanum Pontificem.

Jansenism was an early modern theological movement popular in France in the mid-seventeenth century, that held that only a certain portion of humanity was predestined to be saved. The heresy according to Roman Catholic doctrine, lay in denying the role of free will in the acceptance and use of grace. Jansenism asserts that God's role in the infusion of grace cannot be resisted and does not require human assent whereas the orthodox position holds that "God's free initiative demands man's free response"—that is, humans freely assent or refuse God's gift of grace.

The last case of a heretic being executed  was that of the schoolmaster Cayetano Ripoll, accused of deism by the waning Spanish Inquisition and hanged to death 26 July 1826 in Valencia after a two-year trial.

Modern Roman Catholic response to Protestantism

Some of the doctrines of Protestantism that the Catholic Church considers heretical are: sola scriptura, sola fide, the universal priesthood of all believers, and the denial of transubstantiation.

In his book The Meaning of Christian Brotherhood, Cardinal Ratzinger wrote:

See also
 Heresy in Christianity
 List of heresies in the Catholic Church
 Latae sententiae and ferendae sententiae
 Excommunication in the Catholic Church

Notes

References

Further reading